David Haggerty is an American tennis administrator who was elected President of the International Tennis Federation (ITF) in September 2015. He attended the George Washington University School of Business.

Prior to being elected President of the ITF, Haggerty held the position of the United States Tennis Association (USTA) President. On January 10, 2020, he was elected member of the International Olympic Committee (IOC).

References

1957 births
Living people
International Tennis Federation
Place of birth missing (living people)
George Washington University School of Business alumni
Tennis executives
International Olympic Committee members
Presidents of the International Tennis Federation